Mansour Bagheri is an Iranian retired Taekwondo athlete who represented Iran in two olympic games 1988 and 1992, finishing in the +83 kg 5th place both times.

References

External links
 

Living people
Iranian male taekwondo practitioners
Taekwondo practitioners at the 1988 Summer Olympics
Taekwondo practitioners at the 1992 Summer Olympics
Year of birth missing (living people)
20th-century Iranian people